State Road 451 (SR 451) is a  limited-access toll road connecting SR 414 (Apopka Expressway) and SR 429 (Western Expressway) north to US 441 (SR 500/Orange Blossom Trail).  The entire route is within Apopka.

Route description
The route begins at a large interchange with SR 414 and SR 429, continuing  as a north-south route. The highway then has an at-grade intersection with U.S. Route 441 (US 441; Orange Blossom Trail). The highway then continues  with no intermediate interchanges to its northern terminus an at-grade intersection with Old Dixie Highway. The highway then continues north as Vick Road.

The shortest numbered route within the CFX system, SR 451 is effectively a spur route of SR 429. While the short SR 451 itself has no toll facilities, it is not possible to drive the route (excluding the Vick Road Extension) without paying tolls either on SR 414 or SR 429.

History
The route now designated as SR 451 was formerly SR 429. To allow the extension of SR 429 to its new terminus on US 441 as part of the Wekiva Parkway project, the road now known as SR 451 had to be given a new designation. The road originally would have been designated SR 429A, but it was changed to FL 451 in 2005. In 2012, OOCEA (predecessor to CFX) announced the new designation, which took effect in January 2013.

Exit list

See also
 Central Florida Expressway Authority

References

External links

 SR 451 – Central Florida Expressway Authority

451
451
451
451
Freeways in the United States
Apopka, Florida
2013 establishments in Florida